Bruno Råberg (born July 13, 1954) is a Swedish jazz bassist, composer, and music professor.

Career
Råberg has performed/recorded with Kris Davis, Bruce Barth, Eje Thelin, Jim Black, Chris Cheek, Adam Cruz, George Garzone, Mick Goodrick, Donny McCaslin, Ben Monder, Terri-Lyne Carrington, Bob Moses, Kenny Werner, Matt Wilson, and Mike Mainieri. He is a senior Professor at Berklee College of Music in Boston

Discography as a leader
 Pentimento feat. Donny McCaslin, Anders Boström (Boston Skyline, 1992)
 Orbis feat. Bob Moses, Ole Mathisen (Orbis Music, 1998)
 Presence feat. Ole Mathisen, Marcello Pellitteri (Orbis, 1999)
 Ascensio feat Allan Chase, Phil Grenadier (Orbis, 2003)
 Chrysalis feat. Donny McCaslin, Mick Goodrick (Orbis, 2004)
 Lifelines feat. Ben Monder, Chris Cheek(Orbis, 2008)
 Plunge (Orbis, 2012)
 Hot Box feat Phil Grenadier (Orbis, 2015)
 For the Unknown feat Allan Chase (Orbis, 2016)
 Triloka: Music for Strings feat Layth Sidiq, Naseem Alatrash (Orbis, 2016)
 Tailwind feat. Bruce Barth, Adam Cruz (Red Piano, 2018)
 Fantasy for Woodwind Quintet (Orbis, 2019)
 The Prospector feat Allan Chase, Austin McMahon (Orbis, 2020)

Discography as a sideman

References

External links
 Official site
 JazzTimes review by Bill Milkwoski

1954 births
Living people
American jazz composers
American jazz musicians
American male jazz composers
Swedish jazz composers
Swedish jazz musicians